The Skydiver is an amusement ride produced from 1965 to 1987 by Chance Rides, an American manufacturer based in Wichita, Kansas.

Skydiver cars are mounted on a circular frame – like a Ferris wheel – that spin on a front-back axis similar to a barrel roll. As the ride required two trailers to transport, it was less popular than the Zipper, a similar but smaller ride also manufactured by Chance Rides.

References

Amusement rides
Upside-down amusement rides